KTJ may refer to:

The post nominal of a Knight in the Knights Templar or Ordo Supremus Militaris Templi Hierosolymitani. A Knight wears a red, patriarchal cross edged in gold, suspended below a crown, on the red and black neck ribbon of the Order.
Kyrgyz Railways
Kolej Tuanku Ja'afar